Scottish Women's Football (SWF), formerly known as the Scottish Women’s Football Association (SWFA) between 1972 and 2001, is the governing body for women's association football in Scotland. It is an affiliated national association of the Scottish Football Association (SFA).

In its history, it has run or organised the Scottish Women's Cup, the Scotland women's team, Scottish Women's Football League, Scottish Women's Premier League and other league divisions.

History 
Scotland hosted the first organised games of women's football in 1881, and the sport became popular in the 1920s, attracting crowds of thousands. Women's football was banned from English FA grounds in 1921; the Scottish FA did not follow suit although it was not supportive. The leading team Rutherglen Ladies F.C. played from 1921 to 1939.

The SWFA was founded in 1972, when six teams met and decided to form an Association: Aberdeen Prima Donnas, Cambslang Hooverettes, Dundee Strikers, Edinburgh Dynamos, Westthorn United and Stewarton Thistle.

Initially, the Scottish Football Association (SFA) opposed the formation of the SWFA, but in 1974, it recognised the new association.  However, the SWFA remained small, with membership in the 1970s peaking at 14 teams.  In 1992, it introduced coaching courses, and in 1996 it began organising junior and school football.  In 1998, it affiliated to the SFA.

The association stated that its purpose was, "To promote, foster and develop, in all its branches without discrimination against any organisation or person for reason of race, religion or politics, the game of Association Football for women/girls" (2003). Among its aims in 2021 was, "A game that realises the needs, wants and unlimited ambitions of its girls and women."

This association consists of:
A senior league - including one national league, and divisional leagues.
U13 and U16 leagues in various parts of Scotland.
Development centres open to girls at different age groups nationwide.

See also
 List of women's football clubs in Scotland
 Scottish Women's Football Annual Awards

References

External links
Official website

Women's football in Scotland
Sports organizations established in 1972
1972 establishments in Scotland
Scottish Football Association